Eric Murnan Dill (born February 10, 1981) is an American singer and songwriter.

Personal life
Dill was born and grew up in Indianapolis, Indiana, United States. He became the lead singer of the pop-rock group The Click Five. In February 2007, soon after filming the movie Taking Five with the band, he left Click Five to focus on his solo music career. In early 2007, he wrote "No Surprise", a song that was later the first single on Daughtry's second album, Leave This Town. In late 2012, Eric Dill relocated from Hollywood to his native Indianapolis.

Achievements
In 2012, Dill released his first collection of four songs entitled Wherever You Are. With record producer Matt Radosevich and mastering by Eric Valentine, the sound was created to capture and add the distinct flavor of Dill's delivery of style. Major influences include U2, Nine Inch Nails, Savage Garden, Our Lady Peace and Thirty Seconds to Mars. The collection was recorded at Barefoot Studios in Los Angeles.

Dill's first full-length album, Forever is Not Enough, was released in November 2012. It featured 13 original songs. "War with the Wolves" was the first song released off from the album Forever is Not Enough. The song was listed in the Billboard Top 40 Indicator Chart. "In My Head", another song from the album, was released to radio on January 14, 2013.

References

Living people
1981 births
American male singer-songwriters
American rock singers
American rock songwriters
Musicians from Indianapolis
21st-century American singers
21st-century American male singers
Singer-songwriters from Indiana